Darkovice is a municipality and village in Opava District in the Moravian-Silesian Region of the Czech Republic. It has about 1,400 inhabitants. It is part of historic Hlučín Region.

History
The first written mention of Darkovice is in a deed of Pope Innocent IV from 1250, in which it is stated that King Wenceslaus I of Bohemia donated the village to the Cistercian monastery in Velehrad. Before 1265 a new village called Žibřidovice was established near Darkovice, and the oldest pond in the region was established between them. After the death of King Ottokar II of Bohemia, battles for inheritance took place, and Žibřidovice ceased to exist and Darkovice was abandoned during this war.

In 1320, Darkovice became part of the Landek estate and was administered by the burgrave Přesek of Lichnov, who renewed the village. In 1517, Casimir II, Duke of Cieszyn attached Darkovice to the Hlučín estate. However, Štěpán of Vrbno split this heritage in 1568. By this act, the village fell into the possession of Karel of Vrbno as a part of the Šilheřovice estate.

Darkovice was acquired by Jesuits from Opava in 1673. Their rule led to a series of rebellions in 1734. From 1742 the village belonged to Prussia after Maria Theresa had been defeated. The corvée was abolished here in 1823, 25 years earlier than in the rest of the Kingdom of Bohemia. In 1920, Darkovice became part of the newly established Czechoslovakia.

From 1979 to 1990 the municipality was annexed to Hlučín, but since 1990 Darkovice has been an independent municipality again.

Twin towns – sister cities

Darkovice is twinned with:
 Lyski, Poland

References

External links

Villages in Opava District
Hlučín Region